This is a list of Argentine films which were released in 2015:

External links
2015 in Argentina

2015
Argentina